The 2006 NASDAQ-100 Open was the 22nd edition of this tennis tournament and was played on outdoor hard courts. The tournament was part of the ATP Masters Series of the 2006 ATP Tour and was classified as a Tier I event on the 2006 WTA Tour. Both the men's and the women's events took place at the Tennis Center at Crandon Park in Key Biscayne, Florida, United States, from March 20 through April 2, 2006.

Finals

Men's singles

 Roger Federer defeated  Ivan Ljubičić 7–6(7–5), 7–6(7–4), 7–6(8–6)

Women's singles

 Svetlana Kuznetsova defeated  Maria Sharapova 6–4, 6–3

Men's doubles

 Jonas Björkman &  Max Mirnyi defeated  Bob Bryan &  Mike Bryan 6–4, 6–4

Women's doubles

 Lisa Raymond &  Samantha Stosur defeated  Liezel Huber &  Martina Navratilova 6–4, 7–5

External links
 Men's singles draw
 Men's doubles draw

 
NASDAQ-100 Open
NASDAQ-100 Open
NASDAQ-100 Open
Miami Open (tennis)
NASDAQ-100 Open
NASDAQ-100 Open
NASDAQ-100 Open